Chrostosoma viridipunctata is a moth of the subfamily Arctiinae. It was described by Walter Rothschild in 1911. It is found in Bolivia.

References

Chrostosoma viridipunctata at the Biodiversity Heritage Library

Chrostosoma
Moths described in 1911